Holden Township may refer to the following townships in the United States:

 Holden Township, Goodhue County, Minnesota
 Holden Township, Adams County, North Dakota